Grande Fratello 16 is the sixteenth season of the Italian version of the reality show franchise Big Brother. The season premiered on 8 April 2019 on Canale 5 and concluded on 10 June 2019 for a total of 64 days.

Barbara D'Urso as the main host of the show. The opinionists of this season will be Iva Zanicchi and Cristiano Malgioglio.

The prize for the winner is €100,000.

The primetime show is on every Monday night on Canale 5. The daytime show is broadcast from Monday to Friday at 4:10 pm on Canale 5 and at 1:00 pm and 7:15 pm on Italia 1. Live stream from the house is on every day from 10:00 am to 2:00 am on Mediaset Extra channel and also provided free of charge via the Mediaset Fan app and on the official website of Grande Fratello. Additional contents will be broadcast on La5 and in the various magazine shows of Canale 5, such as Mattino Cinque, Pomeriggio Cinque, Domenica Live and Live - Non è la D'Urso.

As what happened in the Grande Fratello 15, some housemates are already known by the public for having participated in some television programs or for being "relatives" or "ex-boyfriends or ex-girlfriends" of famous people. Therefore, the show also called Grande Fratello Nip by the production or press.

The Grande Ranch
On 3 April 2019, five days before the show begins, four possible competitors were locked up in a ranch nearby the Lazio countryside waiting to learn about their destiny. They are Audrey Chabloz, Angela Losito, Erica Piamonte and Daniele Dal Moro.

In the "Grande Ranch", the four competitors will be challenged with horse saddling, the management and care of farm animals, egg collection and more. And there will be moments of leisure and relaxation in the pool. While they remaining isolated, they were able to interact with the outside through the social networks of Grande Fratello. The cohabitation is informed by the presenter Barbara D'Urso through the show Pomeriggio Cinque.

Housemates

Guest

Future Appearances
In 2022, Daniele Dal Moro returned to compete in Grande Fratello VIP 7.

Nominations table

Notes

TV Ratings

References

External links
 Official site 

17